The University of Agder, formerly known as Agder College and Agder University College, is a public university with campuses in Kristiansand and Grimstad, Norway. The institution was established as a university college (høgskole) in 1994 through the merger of the Agder University College and five other colleges, including a technical college and a nursing school, and was granted the status of a full university in 2007.

History 
The idea of a university in the Agder region is not completely new. In his short period as ruler of the union of Denmark–Norway, Johann Friedrich Struensee planned on reforming the University of Copenhagen. He ordered Bishop Johann Ernst Gunnerus of Trondheim to develop more detailed plans. Gunnerus presented a proposal in 1771 in which he suggested establishing a new university in Norway, and placing it in Kristiansand.

The motives for suggesting Kristiansand as a university town have been debated. Regardless, the idea was soon discarded as planning began for the first Norwegian university. In 1811, a resolution was passed to establish Norway's first university in Christiania (Oslo).

Even without a university in the region, and as the need for better educated employees rose, several smaller colleges were established throughout the Agder region. The first, Christiansands Stiftsseminarium på Holt, later known as Kristiansand Teacher Training College, was founded at Holt, Aust-Agder in 1839, making it one of the oldest institutions of higher education in Norway. It was followed by Arendal College of Nursing (1920), Agder Music Conservatory (1965), Agder Regional College of Technology (1967), Agder Regional College (1969) and Kristiansand College of Nursing (1976).

Agder University College was established by a merger in 1994, when the six public regional colleges in the Agder counties became one institution. The University College received full university accreditation and became the University of Agder on 1 September 2007.

Organisation and administration 

UiA has a shared leadership. The rector, who becomes the head of the university board and bears responsibility for the academic programmes and activities, is elected by the faculty, staff, and students. The university director, by contrast, is the head of administration and is responsible for financial and administrative affairs.

Student culture 
At campus Kristiansand, the heart of the university building is the axis that stretches from the "wandering hall" by the main entrance, to the canteen. The library, two cafés, a book store, the largest lecture halls and other facilities are located along this axis.

Every autumn, experienced students organizes events, stands, competitions and "social groups" to welcome the newly arrived students. Students also organizes several cultural, charitable and athletic associations. In addition to this, UiA offers student accommodation on campus as well as a gym, where students are offered membership on discounted prices. The facilities include a well-equipped gym, a crossfit room, a swimming pool, as well as several changing rooms equipped with saunas.

Virtually all athletic activites at campus Kristiansand is organized by Kristiansand Studentidrettslag (KSI), while the teams at campus Grimstad constitutes Grimstad Studentidrettslag (GSI). Membership is offered to students of UiA and other institutions of higher education in the area only. Sports offered at one or both of the campuses includes football, golf, handball, floorball, basketball, volleyball and multiple martial arts. The male student lacrosse team in Kristiansand is a notable exception, as it operates independently from KSI. Teams from KSI and GSI competes in local leagues as well as selected regional and/or national tournaments. 

Students at UiA also organizes several orchestras and choirs, political and non-profit/charitable associations, as well as associations specific to the different programs. The pubs and concert venues "Østsia" (East side/wing) and "Bluebox" is located at campus Kristiansand and Grimstad, respectively. The students at UiA does not shy away from the general nightlife, however, as they frequent the pubs, bars and clubs in downtown Kristiansand and Grimstad. 

In the summertime, students enjoy hanging out along Agder's scenic beaches, often equipped with volleyball courts. The "city beach" in Kristiansand is a widely roamed location in the warmer months, and the waiting lines for the volleyball courts can be frustratingly long. The annual festival "Palmesus" is hosted on the same beach, and is a popular event for locals, students and tourists alike.

Transport and infrastructure 
Both campuses are located some distance outside their respective city centers, along the E18, one of eastern/southern Norway's major roadways (E18 becomes the equally important E39 right after passing the campus in Kristiansand). 

Campus Kristiansand is served by virtually all bus routes in the city, as it lies along the city's central bus corridor. Therefore, it has numerous connections to local areas and neighboring municipalities alike. It also has several parking lots, with very reasonable prices for students (11kr/day). The bike infrastructure is pretty well-developed. Several bus routes carries travellers from campus to the city center (5-6 minutes travel time), where the Kristiansand bus, train and ferry terminal is located, as well as to Kristiansand airport.

Faculties and academia 
The University of Agder has six faculties as well as an own unit for teacher education.

School of Business and Law 
 Department of Economics and Finance
 Department of Management
 Department of Working Life and Innovation
 Department of Law 
The School of Business and Law is a member of the EFMD and AACSB, and is AACSB-accredited for its high-quality education on an international level as of 2019.

Faculty of Social Sciences 
 Department of Development Studies
 Department of Information Systems
 Department of Political Science and Management
 Department of Sociology and Social Work

Faculty of Fine Arts 
 Department of Music (Gimlemoen)
 Department of Visual and Dramatic Arts (Gimlemoen)

Faculty of Health and Sport Sciences 
 Department of Public Health, Sport and Nutrition (Gimlemoen/Grimstad)
 Department of Health and Nursing Science (Gimlemoen/Grimstad)
 Department of Psychososial Health (Gimlemoen/Grimstad)

Faculty of Humanities and Education 
 Department of Foreign Languages and Translation (Gimlemoen/Grimstad)
 Department of Nordic and Media Studies (Gimlemoen)
 Department of Education (Gimlemoen)
 Department of Religion, Philosophy and History (Gimlemoen)

Faculty of Engineering and Science 
 Department of Mathematical Sciences (Gimlemoen)
 Department of Natural Sciences (Gimlemoen)
 Department of Engineering (Grimstad)
 Department of ICT (Grimstad)

Teacher Education Unit 

The teacher training programmes are organized in an interdisciplinary fashion.

Research centres 
 Achieving Accountability in School Practice
 Center for Artificial Intelligence Research
 Center for intelligent networks and signal processing
 Centre for Business Systems
 Centre for Care Research
 Centre for Cultural Studies
 Centre for Development Studies
 Centre for Didactics
 Centre for Digital Transformation (CeDiT)
 Centre for Entrepreneurship
 Centre for European Studies
 Centre for Gender Equality
 Centre for Innovation and Work Life Studies
 Centre for International Economics and Shipping
 Centre for Multicultural Activities
 Centre for Norwegian Studies Abroad
 Centre for Real Estate
 Center for Sustainable Energy Solutions
 Norwegian Centre for Offshore Wind Energy (NORCOWE)

Library 

Agder University Research Archive (AURA) is a full text digital archive of scientific papers, theses and dissertations from the academic staff and students at the University of Agder. The University Library administrates AURA.

References 

 
Education in Agder
Agder
Agder
Agder
Buildings and structures in Agder
Buildings and structures in Kristiansand
1994 establishments in Norway
2007 establishments in Norway
Agder
Agder